Abgarm (also Romanized as Ābgarm; also known as Āb Garm-e Bozorg) is a village in Ramjerd-e Yek Rural District, in the Central District of Marvdasht County, Fars Province, Iran. At the 2006 census, its population was 98, in 18 families.

References 

Populated places in Marvdasht County